"Sex Drive" is a song by British band Dead or Alive from their 1995 album Nukleopatra.  The single was a minor hit in Australia, where it peaked at number 52 in March 1997.

The song was originally released by Glam in 1994, with the lead singer of Dead or Alive, Pete Burns, as a guest vocalist, but it was re-recorded and remixed for the group's album Nukleopatra.

Track listing

CD single
Japan 1995
 "Sex Drive" - 6:39
 "Rebel Rebel" - 4:18

Australia 1997
 "Sex Drive" (Radio Edit) – 4:22
 "Sex Drive" (Sugar Pumpers Radio Extended Mix) – 5:55
 "Sex Drive" (Album Version) – 5:13
 "What I Want" – 5:25

CD maxi
Australia
 "Sex Drive" (Peewee's Radio Mix) – 4:09  
 "Sex Drive" (Peewee's Extended Remix) – 9:35
 "Sex Drive" (Sugar Pumpers Radio Extended Mix) – 5:54
 "You Spin Me Round (Like a Record)" (Tyme vs Hoops Club Mix) – 6:47
 "Come Home (With Me Baby)" (12" Mix) – 6:19

Chart performance

References

1997 singles
Dead or Alive (band) songs
Songs written by Pete Burns
LGBT-related songs
1994 songs
Sony Music singles